EDA or Eda may refer to:

Computing 
 Electronic design automation
 Enterprise Desktop Alliance, a computer technology consortium
 Enterprise digital assistant
 Estimation of distribution algorithm
 Event-driven architecture
 Exploratory data analysis

Government and politics 
 Economic Development Administration, an agency of the United States government
 Election Defense Alliance, an American voting integrity organization
 European Defence Agency, a branch of the European Union
 European Democratic Alliance, a former political group in the European Parliament
  (Federal Department of Foreign Affairs), a branch of the government of Switzerland
  (Spanish Air Force), the air force of Spain
  (United Democratic Left) (1951-1967, 1977-1985), a former Greek political party
 Electoral District Association, a local unit of a political party in Canada

People 
 Eda (given name), a given name
 Eda (surname), a Japanese surname

Places 
 Eda, Sweden
 Eda glasbruk, Sweden
 Eda Station (disambiguation)

Science and medicine  
 Ectodysplasin A, a protein
 Electrodermal activity
 Electron donor acceptor complexes, a type of Charge-transfer complex
 European Delirium Association
 Exploratory data analysis

Other uses 
 EDA Awards, American film awards
 Eda IF, a Swedish sport club
 Eighth Doctor Adventures, a series of novels based on the television series Doctor Who
 "Eating, Drinking, Adventure". A good mixture of social elements for a decent first Tinder date.